Kevin Lenzo (born 1967) is an American computer scientist. He wrote the initial infobot, founded The Perl Foundation (and was its chairman until 2007) and the Yet Another Perl Conferences (YAPC)., released CMU Sphinx into Open source, founded Cepstral LLC, and has been a major contributor to the Festival Speech Synthesis System, FestVox, and Flite.  His voice is the basis for a number of synthetic voices, including FreeTTS, Flite, and the cmu_us_kal_diphone Festival voice.  He has also contributed Perl modules to CPAN. Kevin was also a founding member of the 1980s funk band "Leftover Funk"

See also
 YAPC, the Yet Another Perl Conferences, founded by Kevin Lenzo
 The Perl Foundation, co-founded with Kurt DeMaagd
 Flite, Festival Speech Synthesis System and in particular kal_diphone (Kevin A Lenzo) made from his voice, and FestVox for building synthetic voices
 The Infobot, an Internet Relay Chat agent
 CMU Sphinx which he released into Open Source
 FreeTTS, a Java port of Flite
 The Perl Programming Language
 The White Camel Awards
 CPAN, the Comprehensive Perl Archive Network
 Cepstral LLC

References

American computer scientists
Computational linguistics researchers
Living people
1967 births